Lacydes incurvata is a moth of the family Erebidae. It was described by G. Ebert in 1973. It is found in Afghanistan.

References

Callimorphina
Moths described in 1973